Rykove, until May 2016 Partyzany, is an urban-type settlement in Henichesk Raion, Kherson Oblast, southern Ukraine. It belongs to Henichesk urban hromada, one of the hromadas of Ukraine. It has a population of

Naming
On 19 May, 2016, the Verkhovna Rada adopted the decision to rename Partyzany to Rykove according to the law prohibiting names of Communist origin.

Economy

Transportation
Rykove is located on the railway line connecting Melitopol with Novooleksiivka and which continues further to Dzhankoi; however, after the annexation of Crimea by the Russian Federation, all traffic to Crimea has been suspended. It is also on the M18 highway, connecting Kharkiv via Dnipro, Zaporizhzhia, and Melitopol with Crimea.

See also 

 Russian occupation of Kherson Oblast

References

Urban-type settlements in Henichesk Raion